The Mount of Beatitudes (Har HaOsher) is a hill in northern Israel, in the Korazim Plateau. It is the traditional site of Jesus' Sermon on the Mount.

Location 
The site known as the Mount of Beatitudes is on the northwestern shore of the Sea of Galilee, between Capernaum and the archeological site of Gennesaret (Ginosar), on the southern slopes of the Korazim Plateau. Its negative altitude (around 25 metres below sea level, nearly 200 metres above the Sea of Galilee) makes it one of the lowest summits of the world. This site, very near Tabgha and also known as Mount Eremos, has been commemorated for more than 1600 years. Other suggested locations for the Jesus' Sermon on the Mount have included the nearby Mount Arbel, or even the Horns of Hattin.

Churches 

A Byzantine church was erected lower down the slope from the current site in the 4th century, and it was used until the 7th century. Remains of a cistern and a monastery are still visible. The current Roman Catholic Franciscan chapel was built in 1937-38 following plans by Italian architect Antonio Barluzzi.

Pope John Paul II celebrated a Mass at this site in March 2000. The Jesus Trail pilgrimage route connects the Mount to other sites traditionally associated with the life of Jesus.

Significance 
 However, the issue is not so much locating the biblically unidentified site of the Sermon on the Mount or identifying the churches built on the location throughout history but determining whether or not such a "sermon" by Jesus of Nazareth actually occurred. The consensus of mainline scholars is that the "sermon" is a literary construct by the writer of the Gospel of Matthew drawn from the sayings and teachings of Jesus scattered throughout the Gospel of Mark and from the non-Markan material that Matthew has in common with Luke (Q), along with Matthew's own, unique source or sources (M). If, as is likely the case, there was no such "sermon," any debate or discussion concerning its geographical location or its place in the chronology of Jesus' career is superfluous.

See also
 Christianity in Israel
 Church of the Beatitudes
 Domus Galilaeae
 Horns of Hattin 
 Tourism in Israel

References 

  Macmillan Bible Atlas, 
 Oxford Archaeological Guide: The Holy Land (paperback, fourth edition (1998)), pg 279.

External links 

Land of Israel
Beatitudes
Beatitudes
Sermon on the Mount
Beatitudes